Avondale railway station is on the Western Line of the Auckland railway network. Relocated in 2008, the station can be accessed from St Jude St, Layard St, and Crayford St.

The proposed Avondale–Southdown Line would connect to the Western Line just east of the station.

History 

 1880: Opened as one of the original stations on the North Auckland Line. The station was known as Whau for the first two years of its existence.
 1882: A post office opened as part of the station.
 1912: The post office closed.
 1914: The platform was upgraded to an island platform layout with a new building on the new platform.
 1915: A signal box was added.
 1966: The line to Morningside was double-tracked.
 1967: The signal box was removed after this section changed to centralised traffic control.
 1993: The platform was raised to meet the requirements of ex-Perth trains.
 1995: The station building was relocated to Swanson. Originally planned for demolition due to its poor state, Waitakere Community Board members Dave Harré and Penny Hulse lobbied the New Zealand Railways Corporation to save and refurbish the building.
 2008: The footbridge was demolished, the platform removed and a temporary station erected 50m to the east of the site.
 2010: A new station was constructed and the line double-tracked westward beyond Avondale. The station opened on 14 June.
 2014: Platforms extended to 150m from 143m for the new electric AM class EMU trains.

Upgrade and relocation 

Until 26 December 2008 it had an island platform just west of Blockhouse Bay Road, reached via a footbridge off the road. In 2010 an upgraded station was built on Layard Street, north of the St Jude Street level crossing and approximately 100m west and 200m south of the old station.

The new station provides better connections with the Avondale town centre and the platform is on a straight section of track, unlike the old platform which was on a large sharp curve.

Electrification work was completed and the station began serving electric trains in 2015.

Services
A number of bus routes pass nearby on Great North Road, Rosebank Road and Blockhouse Bay Road. These include routes 18, 22N, 22R, 138, 191, 195, 209 and 670.

See also 
 List of Auckland railway stations

References 

Rail transport in Auckland
Railway stations in New Zealand
Railway stations opened in 1880
1880 establishments in New Zealand
Buildings and structures in Auckland
West Auckland, New Zealand